Wu Yinghua (1907–1996) was a famous Chinese teacher of Wu-style t'ai chi ch'uan.  She was born in Beijing and died in Shanghai. She was the eldest daughter of Wu Chien-ch'uan, the best known teacher of Wu-style t'ai chi ch'uan.  Her older brothers were Wu Kung-i and Wu Kung-tsao.

Biography
Wu Ying-hua began studying t'ai chi ch'uan at age nine, and by age seventeen, she was a full-time teacher in her father's school. In 1921, she was invited to teach t'ai chi ch'uan in Shanghai. In 1928, her father followed her to Shanghai and she became his teaching assistant. In 1930, she married Ma Yueh-liang who was Wu Chien-ch'uan's senior disciple. In 1935, Wu Chien-ch'uan founded the Chien-ch'uan Tai Chi Chuan Association (鑑泉太極拳社) in Shanghai. Wu Chien-ch'uan died in 1942.

After the Cultural Revolution, at about 1980, it became possible to teach t'ai chi ch'uan publicly in China. About this time her brother Wu Kung-tsao was released from prison and moved to Hong Kong. Wu Ying-hua and Ma Yueh-liang, remaining in mainland China, created a simplified Wu t'ai chi ch'uan form and were again able to have public meetings of the Chien-ch'uan Tai Chi Chuan Association. They taught a large number of students in Shanghai and in their travels to New Zealand, Germany and elsewhere.  Together with Ma Yueh-liang, Wu Ying-hua published several books on Wu-style t'ai chi ch'uan.  The books “Wu style Tai Chi Chuan: Forms, Concepts and Applications of the Original Style” (commonly known as the "Orange Book"), “Wu Simplified Tai Chi Chuan,” and “Wu style Tai Chi K'uai (Fast) Chuan or Wu Style Tai Chi Fast Form” have been collected in a single volume in China. They also co-authored a Wu style sword book. Wu Ying-hua was the senior instructor of the Wu family from 1983 until she died in 1996.

Ma Yueh-liang and Wu Ying-hua are survived by several children and grandchildren, including: Ma Jiangchun (b. 1931), Dr. Ma Hailong (b. 1935), Ma Jiang Bao (b. 1941), and Ma Jiangling (b. 1947). Ma Jiang Bao lived in the Netherlands and taught traditional t'ai chi ch'uan in Europe. He died in 2016. Their adopted daughter Shi Mei Lin now lives and teaches in New Zealand. She also has students in France and in the United States (Tucson, Arizona).

Generational senior instructors of the Wu family
1st Generation

Wu Ch'uan-yü (Wu Quanyou, 吳全佑, 1834–1902), who learned from Yang Luchan and Yang Pan-hou, was senior instructor of the family from 1870-1902.

2nd generation

His oldest son, Wu Chien-ch'üan (Wu Jianquan, 吳鑑泉, 1870–1942), was senior from 1902-1942.

3rd Generation

His oldest son, Wu Kung-i (Wu Gongyi, 吳公儀, 1900–1970) was senior from 1942-1970.

3rd Generation

Wu Kung-i's younger brother, Wu Kung-tsao (Wu Gongzao, 吳公藻, 1903–1983), was senior from 1970-1983.

3rd Generation

Wu Kung-i's younger sister, Wu Ying-hua (Wu Yinghua, 吳英華, 1907–1997), was senior from 1983-1997.

4th Generation

Wu Kung-i's daughter, Wu Yen-hsia (Wu Yanxia, 吳雁霞, 1930–2001) was senior from 1997-2001.

4th Generation

Wu Kung-tsao's son, Wu Ta-hsin (Wu Daxin, 吳大新, 1933–2005), was senior from 2001-2005.

5th Generation

The current senior instructor of the Wu family is Wu Ta-k'uei's son Wu Kuang-yu (Wu Guangyu, Eddie Wu, 吳光宇, born 1946.

T'ai chi ch'uan lineage tree with Wu-style focus

Bibliography
Wu Kung-tsao. Wu Family T'ai Chi Ch'uan (吳家太極拳), Hong Kong, 1980, Toronto 2006, .
 Wu Ying Hua, Ma Yueh Liang, Shi Mei Lin (1987). Wu Style Tai Chi Fast Form. Henan Science Skills Ltd. Henan (only available in Chinese) .
 Wu Ying Hua, Ma Yueh Liang, Shi Mei Lin (1991). Wu Style Tai Chi Fast Form. Shanghai Book Co Ltd, Hong Kong (only available in Chinese) . .
 Wu Ying Hua, Ma Yueh Liang(1993). Wu Style Tai Chi Chuan Forms, Concepts and Application of the Original Style. Shanghai Book Co Ltd, Hong Kong. .
 Ma Yueh Liang & Zee Wen(1986, 1990, 1995). Wu Style Tai Chi Chuan Push Hands. Shanghai Book Co Ltd, Hong Kong. .
 Dr Wen Zee (2002) Wu Style Tai Chi Chuan, Ancient Chinese way to health. North Atlantic Books. .

External links

Ma Jiang-bao's Traditional Wu style Taijiquan website
Wu Style Tai Chi New Zealand website

Wu style Taichichuan: Forms, Concepts and Applications of the Original Style

1907 births
1996 deaths
Chinese tai chi practitioners
Manchu martial artists
Sportspeople from Beijing
Writers from Beijing
People's Republic of China writers
Chinese non-fiction writers